Acidipila rosea  is a Gram-negative, chemoorganotrophic, acidophilic and non-motile bacterium from the genus of Acidipila which has been isolated from an acid mine drainage.

References

External links 
Type strain of Acidipila rosea at BacDive -  the Bacterial Diversity Metadatabase

Acidobacteriota
Bacteria described in 2015
Acidophiles